is a Japanese ice dancer. With her former skating partner, Shingo Nishiyama, she is a two-time Japanese national junior ice dance champion (2020, 2021) and a 2020 Winter Youth Olympics champion in the team event.

Personal life 
Utana Yoshida was born on September 6, 2003, in Kurashiki, Japan. She owns a toy poodle named Koko.

Career

Early career 
Yoshida began skating in 2009 and previously competed in ladies' singles. She placed seventh at the novice level at the Chu-Shikoku-Kyushu Regional in 2014, and thus failed to advance to the 2014–15 Japan Championships. Yoshida switched to ice dance in 2016, partnering with Takumi Sugiyama. Yoshida / Sugiyama were fourth at the 2016–17 Japan Junior Championships and won the advanced novice gold medal at the 2017 Mentor Toruń Cup. Yoshida / Sugiyama split at the end of the season, and she was partnerless for two seasons.

Yoshida teamed up with Shingo Nishiyama in early 2019 after a tryout arranged by the Japan Skating Federation in fall 2018 and moved to train with him and his coaches at the Toronto Cricket, Skating and Curling Club in Canada in February 2019.

2019–2020 season 
In their first season as a partnership, Yoshida/Nishiyama placed sixth at both 2019 JGP United States and 2019 JGP Italy. They then won gold at the Western Sectional and advanced to the 2019–20 Japan Junior Championships, where they again won gold, ahead of Ayumi Takanami / Yoshimitsu Ikeda. As a result, Yoshida/Nishiyama were assigned to the 2020 World Junior Championships and the 2020 Winter Youth Olympics. They were invited to skate in the gala at the 2019 NHK Trophy as junior national champion.

At the 2020 Winter Youth Olympics, Yoshida / Nishiyama placed sixth in the ice dance event with a new personal best, following a sixth-place rhythm dance and a fourth-place free dance. They were chosen by draw to be part of Team Courage for the mixed-NOC team event, alongside singles' skaters Arlet Levandi of Estonia and Ksenia Sinitsyna of Russia and pairs team Alina Butaeva / Luka Berulava of Georgia. Yoshida/Nishiyama won the free dance portion of the team event, ahead of both the silver and bronze medalists from the individual ice dance event, to help Team Courage win the gold medal.

Yoshida/Nishiyama set a goal of being in the top ten at the 2020 World Junior Championships.  They placed twelfth in Tallinn.

2020–2021 season 
Due to the COVID-19 pandemic, the Junior Grand Prix, where Yoshida/Nishiyama would have competed, was cancelled. In November, they won their second consecutive junior national title at the 2020–21 Japan Junior Championships.

Yoshida/Nishiyama announced their split in January 2021. In May 2021, Yoshida announced her partnership with American skater Seiji Urano for Japan.

2021–2022 season 
Yoshida/Urano did not appear in any major international or domestic events before announcing their split in December 2021.

Programs

With Nishiyama

With Sugiyama

Competitive highlights 
JGP: Junior Grand Prix

With Nishiyama

With Sugiyama

Women's Singles

Detailed results

With Nishiyama

Junior results

With Sugiyama

References

External links 
 
 

2003 births
Japanese female ice dancers
Living people
Figure skaters at the 2020 Winter Youth Olympics
People from Kurashiki
Sportspeople from Okayama Prefecture